is the second EP by Japanese rock band Maximum the Hormone, released on 23 October 2002.

Track listing

Personnel
 Daisuke – lead and backing vocals, drums (9, 10)
 Maximum the Ryo – guitar, backing and lead vocals
 Ue-chan – bass guitar, backing vocals
 Nao – drums (1-8), backing and lead vocals

References

Maximum the Hormone albums
Japanese-language EPs
2002 EPs